Patna Municipal Corporation or Patna Nagar Nigam,  PMC, is the civic body that governs Patna, the capital of Bihar in India.Municipal Corporation mechanism in India was introduced during British Rule with formation of municipal corporation in Madras (Chennai) in 1688, later followed by municipal corporations in Bombay (Mumbai) and Calcutta (Kolkata) by 1762. Patna Municipal Corporation consists of democratically elected members, is headed by a Mayor, and administers the city's infrastructure, public services, and supplies.

History
The Patna Municipality, established on 2 November 1864 was renamed to Patna City Municipality in 1917. Municipal Corporation mechanism in India was introduced during British Rule with formation of municipal corporation in Madras (Chennai) in 1688, later followed by municipal corporations in Bombay (Mumbai) and Calcutta (Kolkata) by 1762. Patna City Municipality along with Patna Administrative Committee and Patna Bankipur Joint Water Works Committee were substituted by the Patna Municipal Corporation (PMC), which came into force on 15 August 1952 under the provision of the Patna Municipal Act, 1951. The first election of the PMC councilors were held in March 1954, but they came in office on 1 February 1955.

Overview

Patna Municipal Corporation administers an area of 108.87 km2. There are 75 wards placed under executive control of six administrative circles and has a population of 1.7 million as per 2011 Census.

Each ward elects a councilor to the PMC. The Mayor is usually chosen through indirect election by the councilors from among themselves for a term of two and a half years.

Each administrative circle is administered by an Executive officer who is deputed by the Government of Bihar. The Municipal commissioner is the Chief executive officer and head of the executive arm of the corporation. Although the Municipal corporation is the legislative body that lays down policies for the governance of the city, it is the commissioner who is responsible for the execution of the policies.

By means of the standing committees, the corporation undertakes urban planning and maintains roads, government-aided schools, hospitals, and municipal markets. As Patna's apex body, the corporation discharges its functions through the mayor-in-council, which comprises a mayor, a deputy mayor, and other elected members of the PMC. The functions of the PMC include water supply, drainage and sewerage, sanitation, solid waste management, street lighting, and building regulation. It also deals with the issue of birth registration and death registration. Municipal Commissioner is the executive head of the corporation, who is assisted by a large number of officers, belonging to different departments in the corporation.
Administrative circles and Wards:

The corporation also has eight divisions viz. Azimabad Division, Bankipur Division, Ganga Division, Kankarbagh Division, New Capital Division, Patliputra Division, Patna City Division and Water Board Division for the execution of various infrastructure works each of which has an executive engineer.

Departments
The Patna Municipal Corporation headquarter has following departments for the functioning of various works assigned under the Bihar Municipal Act, 2007:

Establishment Section
Finance and Accounts Section
Revenue Section
Estate Section
Planning Section
Engineering Section
Urban Planning Section
Sanitation Section
Vigilance Section
Legal Section
Legislative Section
RTI Section
E-Governance Section

Services, Campaigns and Initiatives

Patna Municipal Corporation started the process of bringing new life in its defunct status in the year 2018, the 155th year of its formation under the leadership of Municipal Commissioner Anupam Kumar Suman. The City of Patna received a fresh lease of life through a total and comprehensive renewal approach. New commissioner claimed that he had changed the functioning of PMC through various urban policy interventions including use of innovative technological measures. The year 2018-2019 brought various initiatives and development in the City of Patna.

Door-to-Door Garbage Collection Service

Door-to-Door Garbage Collection Service initiated in the City of Patna from 2 October 2018. It was the first occasion in the history of the city that all 75 wards were covered under the systematic door-to-door garbage collection. A fleet of 557 vehicles performs this service every day, round the year.

After the inclusion of more than 800 small and big vehicles in the Waste Management Army, PMC imported the biggest warrior in its camp to fight road dirt and dust pollution.
The 10 self-propelled vacuum road-sweeping machines, from Italy and Turkey to clean the City of Patna roads.

One Dream, Patna Clean Initiative

A participatory campaign called 'One Dream, Patna Clean' was initiated under which every Sunday the team of corporations along with the general public and most students started to clean one specific area. This campaign not only brought a kind of awareness in the city but it was more effective in creating sensitization among the sanitary workers and street bureaucrats about what they were up to.

Batti Jalao Campaign 

Under this campaign, 72,257 LED streetlights were installed to brighten up the streets of the City of Patna. First time in the history of the city, such a large number of streetlights were installed, without leaving any dark space.

AutoMAP: Building Plan Approval System 

Patna Municipal Corporation becomes the first urban local body of Bihar to launch the online approval system for building plans. AutoMAP can be used to apply for a new building plan, revision of approved building plan, addition/alterations of existing buildings with prior approvals and occupancy permits from Patna Municipal Corporation and relating to categories of buildings mentioned in Bihar Building Bylaws 2014.

Gharaunde Se Ghar Tak 

Due to rapid rural-to-urban migration, economic stagnation, and poverty, slums are formed in every city. Lack of proper economic accommodation and basic facilities the slum dwellers are facing ghastly hygiene issues. Therefore, Patna Municipal Corporation initiated a Campaign named "Gharaunde Se Ghar Tak" to upgrade the lifestyle of slum dwellers which intends to function on basic amenities in every area. Such as 
Community Toilets 
Supply of Potable water
Proper maintenance of street lights
Cleaning of streets and sewers
Plantation on roadsides
Door to Door Garbage collection
Availability of mobile medicals vans for primary health services
Self Help Group formation, Career Counseling, and Skill Development

PMC has also joined hands with UNFPA, a United Nations wing, for the training of municipal workers who mostly resides in these slums.

Patna Smart City Limited 
Patna Smart City Limited is an SPV formed on 9 November 2017 under the Smart City Mission of Government of India. The Divisional Commissioner of Patna is its chairman and the Patna Municipal Commissioner is its managing director. Patna Smart City Projects took off under the leadership of then Municipal Commissioner-cum-Managing Director Anupam kumar Suman who awarded all the projects within the time frame allowed by the Government of India and thus he launched various projects and pushed them up just within 1 year of its formation.

As of September 2021, Only six out of 83 Patna smart city projects completed in 4 years. The six completed projects include a mega screen (75x42ft) installed at Gandhi Maidan at the cost of around Rs 7 crore, rejuvenation of Adalatganj pond, re-modeling of 1.25 km long Beerchand Patel Path, wall art or painting for social awareness, integrated solid waste management system and integrated control and command centre.

Mithila meets Magadh 
One of the World's Largest Painting Campaigns, "Mithila meets Magadh" was a joint initiative of Patna Municipal Corporation and Patna Smart City Limited under the leadership of Municipal Commissioner Anupam Kumar Suman involving hundreds of Mithila Painters aiming to remove all the garbage vulnerable points of the city. The Campaign successfully completed its first phase of Wall Painting on the streets of Patna with a total of 6.18 lakhs sq.ft area decorated with beautiful murals.

Kusumpur Returns 
Kusumpur (city of flowers) is the earliest known name of the city of Patna before it first became Pushpapur and then Patliputra (following the name of Patli tree). Even in the modern period, there were some big size gardens(baghs) like garden bagh and Kankarbagh. In a bid to regain City Of Patna its status of "CityOfFlower", and to bring back the flowery tradition of this great city an ambitious project by the name of "Kusumpur Returns" was started. Under "Kusumpur Returns" 5300 plants were distributed by Patna Smart City among the voters during General Elections 2019 at Vasundhara Matdan Kendra to make citizens aware of the importance of plants. Other 3000 plants were planted on Ganga River Front on the occasion of World Environment Day 2019. Up to 1 lac plants and saplings are to be planted during the monsoon season of 2019

Revenue 

The following are the Income sources for the Corporation from the Central and State Government.

Revenue from taxes 
Following is the Tax related revenue for the corporation:

 Property tax
 Profession tax
 Entertainment tax
 Grants from Central and State Government like Goods and Services Tax
 Advertisement tax

Revenue from non-tax sources 

Following is the Non Tax related revenue for the corporation:

 Water usage charges
 Fees from Documentation services
 Rent received from municipal property
 Funds from municipal bonds

References

External links

Municipal corporations in Bihar
Government of Patna
1952 establishments in Bihar